Nosratollah Noohian (pen name Nooh, ; 1931– 10 August 2020) was an Iranian poet, journalist, lecturer and left-leaning political activist.

Life 
He was born in 1931 in Semnan province in Iran and moved to Tehran in 1950 where his literary and political career began.

With increasing political unrest following the 1953 Iranian coup d'état, he was briefly arrested and after gaining his freedom, continued to publish under the pseudonyms "Sepand" and "Mikh".

From 1960 he worked as a reporter for Kayhan newspaper (until 1979) and collaborated with many other Tehran publications.

He emigrated to the U.S. in 1987 and continued his literary work.

Poetry
His first published poem was in 1951 for the satirical paper Chalangar (under the editorship of Mohammad Ali Afrashte. Thereafter his poems were published under the pen name Nooh.

Soon after the publication of his first book of poetry, The Wounded Wolf, in 1954, he was arrested and the book was banned.

The poetry collection "Wilted Flowers" was published in 1957, followed by "World of Colors" in 1963. Following the 1979 Iranian Revolution his political poetry was published in the book "Child of Suffering". In the US his book of poetry "Extinguished Fire Temple" was published in 1998, followed by "Naneh's Sayings - Poems in Semnani Dialect" in 2001.

Literary works
His literary compilations include Biographies of Poets of Semnan (1958), which was republished in the US in 2001, "Shining Stars" (1959) a collection of published articles relating to Persian poetry, and "Works of Raf'at Semnani" (1960) (رفعت سمنانی) with an introduction by Zabihollah Safa.

The 3 volume collection on the life and works of Mohammad Ali Afrashte was published in the years following the 1979 revolution. These were: "Poetical Works of Mohammad Ali Afrashte", "Forty Stories", "Plays, Passion Plays, and Travelogues".

Noohian edited and published Forsat Shirazi's "Monuments of Persians" along with a critical introduction and biography of the author in 1983.

While in the U.S., he re-published as one volume the politico-satirical journal Ahangar, which was published in Iran following the 1979 Revolution. In the introduction of the volume, Noohian delved into the history of the journal, including its founding, publication, censorship and eventual banning of the journal.

The seminal book Analysis of Satire in Persian Literature and Media was published in San Jose, California in 1994 with an introduction by Mohammad Jafar Mahjoub.

He collected unpublished works of Yaghma Jandaghi  and with a critical introduction published them in the U.S. in 2006.

Hafez Class
Nooh has been teaching weekly classes on the great Persian poet Hafez in the Bay Area since 1991. The class has been the venue of many luminaries in Persian poetry, including Houshang Ebtehaj, Esmail Khoi,  and Simin Behbahani, among others.

Memoirs & lectures
In the years living in the U.S., Mr. Nooh continued his love for Persian poetry by giving lectures throughout the U.S. and Canada on topics around satire and Persian poetry, including in North Carolina, Maryland and Virginia, Orlando, Toronto 
 and Vancouver.

Mr. Nooh's memoirs, with the title "Yadmandeha" (Memoirs), covering fifty years of literary and political upheavals during Iran's constructive years was published in five volumes in San Jose.

Works

Poetry
 گرگ مجروح (Wounded Wolf), 1954
 گلهایی که پژمرد (Wilted Flowers), 1957
 دنیای رنگها (World of Colors), 1963
 فرزند رنج (Child of Suffering), 1979
 آتشکده سرد (Extinguished Fire Temple), 1998
 ننین حکاتی (Naneh's Sayings), 2001

Author
 بررسی طنز در ادبیات و مطبوعات فارسی (Analysis of Satire in Persian Literature and Media), 1994
 یادمانده ها : از بزرگ علوی تا رحمان هاتفی (Memoirs: Literary, Professional & Political), in 5 volumes, 2002–2014

Editor
 تذکره شعرای سمنان (Biographies of Poets of Semnan), 1958 (reprinted 2001 in U.S.)
 ستارگان تابان (Shining Stars), 1959
 دیوان رفعت سمنانی (Works of Raf'at Semnani), 1960
 Works of Mohammad Ali Afrashte
 مجموعه آثارمحمد علي افراشته (Poetical Works)
 چهل داستان (Forty Stories)
 نمایشنامه ها،تعزیه ها،سفرنامه (Plays, Passion Plays, and Travelogues)
 آثار عجم (Monuments of Persians), by Forsat Shirazi, 1983
 آهنگر (Ahangar), 1993 (republished in the U.S.)
 یغمای جندقی: عبیدی دیگر در دوره قاجار (Yaghma Jandaghi, Another Obeid during the Qajar Era), 2006

References

External links
 www.safinehnooh.com

20th-century Iranian poets
1931 births
21st-century Iranian poets
Living people